Middlesex County is located in central New Jersey, United States, extending inland from the Raritan Valley region to the northern portion of the Jersey Shore. As of the 2020 United States Census, the county's population was enumerated at 863,162, its highest decennial count ever and an increase of 53,304 (6.6%) from the 809,858 residents counted at the 2010 census. Middlesex is New Jersey's third-most populous county and is part of the New York metropolitan area. Many communities within the county serve as commuter towns to and from New York City and other points north. 

The county is located in the middle of the Northeast megalopolis of the U.S. Its county seat is the city of New Brunswick, a center for the sciences, arts, and cultural activities, and the headquarters of the state's flagship academic institution, Rutgers University. The center of population of the state of New Jersey is also located within Middlesex County, in East Brunswick, just east of the New Jersey Turnpike. Middlesex County hosts an extensive transportation network, including several rail stations along the heavily traveled Northeast Corridor Line of the New Jersey Transit commuter rail system, as well as the intersection of the New Jersey Turnpike and the Garden State Parkway, the state's two busiest motor vehicle roadways, in Woodbridge Township. Middlesex County holds the nickname, The Greatest County in the Land. The county is located in the Central Jersey region. 

The county was primarily settled due to its optimal location along the Raritan River. Middlesex was originally formed as one of four administrative districts within Province of East Jersey in 1675, together with Bergen, Essex and Monmouth districts. Middlesex County was formed within East Jersey on March 7, 1683. The population increased so the county was partitioned on October 31, 1693 into the townships of Piscataway, Perth Amboy, and Woodbridge. Adjacent Somerset County was established on May 14, 1688, created from portions of Middlesex County.

The county's first court met in June 1683 in Piscataway, and held session at alternating sites over the next century in Perth Amboy, Piscataway, and Woodbridge before relocating permanently to New Brunswick in 1778. Middlesex County is most demographically notable as the U.S. county with the highest concentration of Asian Indians, at nearly 20% in 2020, spanning the county's boundaries between Little India, Edison/Iselin in the north and Monroe Township at its southern tip.

Geography and climate
Middlesex has a hot-summer humid continental climate (Dfa) which borders a humid subtropical climate (Cfa) on Raritan Bay and Arthur Kill. Average monthly temperatures in downtown New Brunswick range from 31.7 °F in January to 75.6 °F in July, while in South Amboy they range from 32.3 °F in January to 75.9 °F in July.

The county is named after the historic English county of Middlesex.

Bisected by the Raritan River, the county is topographically typical of Central Jersey in that it is largely flat. The majority of the county is located on the inner coastal plain, with the remainder of the county being located on the Eastern Piedmont.

Demographics

Asian community
Middlesex County is prominently known for its significant concentration of Asian Indians. The growing Little India is a South Asian-focused commercial strip in Middlesex County, the U.S. county with the highest concentration of Asian Indians. The Oak Tree Road strip runs for about one-and-a-half miles through Edison and neighboring Iselin in Woodbridge Township, near the area's sprawling Chinatown and Koreatown, running along New Jersey Route 27. It is the largest and most diverse South Asian cultural hub in the United States. Monroe Township in Middlesex County has experienced a particularly rapid growth rate in its Indian American population, with an estimated 5,943 (13.6%) as of 2017, which was 23 times the 256 (0.9%) counted as of the 2000 Census; and Diwali is celebrated by the township as a Hindu holiday. Carteret's Punjabi Sikh community, variously estimated at upwards of 3,000, is the largest concentration of Sikhs in New Jersey. In Middlesex County, election ballots are printed in English, Spanish, Gujarati, Hindi, and Punjabi.

As of 2017 Census estimates, there were 201,243 people of Asian descent in Middlesex County accounting for 24% of the county's total population. At 61.57% of the population of Asian descent, Indian Americans accounted for 12.93% (104,705 people) of the county's total population in 2010, increasing to 127,875 (15.3%, the highest of any U.S. county) by 2017, more than that of the other Asian sub-groups combined.

2020 Census
As of the Census of 2020, the county had 863,162 people, 285,906 households, and 209,808 families. The county's racial makeup was 41.9% White, 9.8% African American, 0.53% Native American, 26.5% Asian, and 9.06% from two or more races. Hispanic or Latino of any race were 22.4% of the population.

There were 285,906 households, of which 34.6% had children under the age of 18 living with them, 56.9% were married couples living together, 24.2% had a female householder with no husband present, 14.2% had a male householder with no wife present and 26.6% were non-families. 14.8% of all households were made up of individuals, and 10.8% had someone living alone who was 65 years of age or older. The average household size was 2.80 and the average family size was 3.32.

About 21.6% of the county's population was under age 18, 9.3% was from age 18 to 24, 40.1% was from age 15 to 44, and 15.5% was age 65 or older. The median age was 39.3 years. The gender makeup of the county was 49.4% male and 50.5% female. For every 100 females, there were 97.8 males.

The county's median household income was $93,418, and the median family income was $107,149. About 8.8% of the population were below the poverty line, including 11.1% of those under age 18 and 8.8% of those age 65 or over.

2010 Census

Government

County government

Middlesex County is governed by a Board of Commissioners, which is comprised of seven members who are elected at-large on a partisan basis to serve three-year terms of office on a staggered basis, with either two or three seats coming up for election each year as part of the November general election. At an annual reorganization meeting held in January, the board selects from among its members a Commissioner Director and deputy director. The Commissioner Director appoints commissioners to serve as chairpersons and members on the various committees which oversee county departments. Middlesex County also elects three "constitutional officers" whose existence is laid out in the New Jersey Constitution. The County Clerk and Surrogate serve five-year terms and the Sheriff serves a three-year term of office. In 2016, freeholders were paid $23,438 and the freeholder director was paid an annual salary of $24,428, though Ronald Rios has accepted a salary of $8,340 as director.

, Middlesex County's Commissioners (with terms for director and deputy ending every December 31st) are:

Article VII Section II of the New Jersey State Constitution requires each county in New Jersey have three elected administrative officials known as "constitutional officers." These officers are the County Clerk and County Surrogate (both elected for five-year terms of office) and the County Sheriff (elected for a three-year term). Middlesex county's constitutional officers are:

The Middlesex County Prosecutor is Chris Kubereit who was sworn in as acting County Prosecutor in September 2019, replacing Andrew C. Carey of Monroe Township. Middlesex County constitutes Vicinage 8 of the New Jersey Superior Court; the vicinage is seated at the Middlesex County Courthouse, at 56 Paterson Street in New Brunswick. The Middlesex Vicinage also has facilities for the Family Part at the Middlesex County Family Courthouse at 120 New Street, also in New Brunswick; there are also other facilities in New Brunswick and Perth Amboy for Probation. The Assignment Judge for Vicinage 8 is Alberto Rivas.

Federal Representatives 
The 6th and 12th Congressional Districts cover the county.

State Representatives

Sheriffs 
Thomas N. Acken served as the sheriff in 1891. Joseph Spicuzzo served in 2014 and was arrested for bribery. Mildred S. Scott is the current county sheriff, she was sworn in on January 1, 2011, as the first female sheriff of Middlesex County and the first African-American sheriff in the state of New Jersey.

Politics 
As of August 1, 2020, there were a total of 545,795 registered voters in Middlesex County, of which 229,982 (42.1%) were registered as Democrats, 84,258 (15.4%) were registered as Republicans and 224,058 (41.1%) were registered as Unaffiliated. There were 7,497 (1.4%) voters registered to other parties. After being a Republican stronghold in the late 19th and early 20th centuries, Middlesex County leaned Democratic for much of the 20th century beginning with Franklin Roosevelt's victory in the county in 1932. Throughout the twentieth century, in close elections, the county would always vote Democratic, sometimes by solid margins, but the county was willing to flip Republican in the midst of nationwide Republican landslides in the 1970s and 1980s. However, since the 1990s, Middlesex County has become a Democratic stronghold at the national level.

In 2008, Barack Obama carried Middlesex County by a much larger 21.8% margin over John McCain, Obama taking 60.2% of the vote to McCain's 38.4%, while Obama won New Jersey overall by 15.5% over McCain. In 2012, Obama won an even more commanding victory in the county, receiving 63.2% of the vote to Republican Mitt Romney's 35.6%, a Democratic victory margin of 27.6%, while carrying New Jersey overall by 17.8%. Like much of the New York City metropolitan area, Middlesex County was one of the few parts of the country to swing even harder in Obama's favor in 2012 compared to 2008, even as he lost ground nationally. Some credit the swing towards Obama to his response towards Superstorm Sandy, which hit the New York City metro area in late October 2012, just a few days before the election. In 2016, Democrat Hillary Clinton carried Middlesex County by a tighter 21.4% margin over Republican Donald Trump, while Clinton won New Jersey overall by 14.1% over Trump. In 2020, Democrat Joe Biden carried Middlesex County by a margin of 22.03%, a slight improvement from 2016, with Biden taking 60.22% of the vote to Donald Trump's 38.19%.

|}

In the 2009 gubernatorial election, Republican Chris Christie received 47% of the vote, defeating incumbent Democrat Corzine, who received around 45%. In the 2013 gubernatorial election, incumbent governor Chris Christie improved on his margin in Middlesex County from 2009, carrying the county by about 18% over Democrat Barbara Buono, with Christie receiving 58% of the vote to Buono's 40%. In the 2017 gubernatorial election, Democrat Phil Murphy won Middlesex County with a wide 17% margin over Republican Kim Guadagno, with Murphy getting 57% of the vote to Guadagno's 40% of the vote. In the 2021 gubernatorial election, Republican Jack Ciattarelli received 43.4% of the vote (90,297 ballots cast) to Democrat Phil Murphy's 55.9% (8116,352 votes).

Transportation
Middlesex County hosts various county roads, state routes, US routes, and interstate highways, as well as toll highways.

County roads include CR 501, CR 514, CR 516 (only in Old Bridge), CR 520 (only in Old Bridge), CR 522, CR 527, CR 529, CR 531, CR 535, and CR 539 (only in Cranbury).

The state routes are: Route 18, Route 26 (only in North Brunswick – entirely concurrent with Livingston Avenue), Route 27, Route 28, Route 32, Route 33 (only in Monroe Township), Route 34 (only in Old Bridge), Route 35, Route 91 (concurrent with Jersey Avenue in North Brunswick and entering New Brunswick), Route 171, Route 172 (only in New Brunswick), Route 184 and Route 440.

U.S. Routes include: Route 1, Route 9, Route 1/9 (only in Woodbridge) and Route 130.

The county also includes some limited access highways and Interstates as well. Middlesex County hosts the southern end of I-287 which turns into Route 440 that connects to the Outerbridge Crossing. The Garden State Parkway passes through the eastern part of the county, which features nine interchanges and the northern start/end of the split-roadways (Express & Local Lanes). The New Jersey Turnpike carries I-95 through the center of the county. The Turnpike has five interchanges in Middlesex County: Exit 12 in Carteret, Exit 11 in Woodbridge, Exit 10 in Edison, Exit 9 in East Brunswick and Exit 8A in Monroe Township.

The New Jersey Department of Transportation is upgrading the Route 18 "avenue" to a freeway between the Route 1 interchange all the way up to the new 18 Extension in Piscataway.

The Turnpike Authority planned to build Route 92, which was to start near the intersection of Ridge Road & Route 1 in South Brunswick to Interchange 8A in Monroe Township. This plan was cancelled on December 1, 2006.

The southern end of the "dual-dual" configuration (inner car lanes and outer truck lanes) used to be one mile south of Interchange 8A at the border of Cranbury and Monroe Township. It was relocated to Exit 6 in Mansfield Township in Burlington County after the Turnpike widening project was completed in early November 2014.

Public transportation
NJ Transit provides Middlesex County with frequent commuter rail service along the North Jersey Coast Line, Northeast Corridor Line, and Raritan Valley Line. The North Jersey Coast Line runs through the eastern part of the county. The Northeast Corridor Line runs through the northern and central part of the county. The Raritan Valley Line serves Dunellen and is accessible to other communities along the county's northern border with Union and Somerset counties.

Intercity rail service is provided by Amtrak. The routes that run through Middlesex County are the Acela Express, Keystone, Northeast Regional, and Vermonter services, although only the Keystone and Northeast Regional have regular stops within Middlesex County, at either New Brunswick or Metropark station. The Acela service also occasionally stops at Metropark.

Bus service in Middlesex County is provided by New Jersey Transit, Coach USA's Suburban Transit, the extensive Rutgers Campus bus network, the MCAT shuttle system, and DASH buses. There are bus routes that serve all townships in the county on weekdays, and studies are being conducted to create the New Brunswick Bus Rapid Transit system.

Education

Higher education
 Middlesex County College (Edison - main campus; New Brunswick, Perth Amboy)
 Rutgers University New Brunswick Campus (New Brunswick, Piscataway)
 Rutgers Biomedical and Health Sciences (New Brunswick)
 Princeton University – Forrestal Campus (Plainsboro)
 DeVry University (North Brunswick)
 Chamberlain University (North Brunswick)
 New Brunswick Theological Seminary (New Brunswick Campus)

K-12 schools
School districts, all officially designated as K-12, include:

 Carteret Borough School District
 Cranbury Township School District
 Dunellen Borough School District
 East Brunswick Township School District
 Edison Township School District
 Highland Park Borough School District
 Jamesburg Borough School District
 Metuchen Borough School District
 Middlesex Borough School District
 Milltown Borough School District
 Monroe Township School District
 New Brunswick City School District
 North Brunswick Township School District
 Old Bridge Township School District
 Perth Amboy City School District
 Piscataway Township School District
 Sayreville Borough School District
 South Amboy City School District
 South Brunswick Township School District
 South Plainfield Borough School District
 South River Borough School District
 Spotswood Borough School District
 West Windsor-Plainsboro Regional School District
 Woodbridge Township School District

Healthcare
The county offers more than 1,900 inpatient beds among five major hospitals.

Economy
Major non-governmental employers in Middlesex County include the following, grouped by ranges of employees:

 9,010: Rutgers University
5,000 – 5,249: Robert Wood Johnson University Hospital
 3,500 – 3,749: Bristol-Myers Squibb, Wakefern Food Corporation
 3,000 – 3,249: Merrill Lynch & Company, Novo Nordisk
 2,750 – 2,999: Johnson & Johnson, Prudential Insurance Company, Silverline Building Products, St. Peter's University Hospital, Telcordia Technologies
 2,500 – 2,749: JFK Medical Center, Raritan Bay Medical Center
 2,000 – 2,249: Pathmark
 1,750 – 1,999: Home Depot, United Parcel Service
 1,500 – 1,749: Amerada Hess Corporation, Dow Jones & Company, Siemens AG
 1,250 – 1,499: AT&T, BASF (formerly Engelhard)
 1,000 – 1,249: Aetna, Fujitsu, Prudential
 Undisclosed: Canon, Japanese company specializing in imaging products.

Municipalities

The 25 municipalities in Middlesex County (with 2010 Census data for population, housing units and area in square miles) are: Other, unincorporated communities in the county are listed next to their parent municipality. Many of these areas are census-designated places that have been defined by the United States Census Bureau for enumeration purposes within a Township and for which 2010 population data is included in parentheses.

Parks and recreation

 Donaldson Park
 Carteret Park
 Carteret Waterfront Park
 Edison Park
 Fords Park
 Johnson Park
 Medwick Park
 Merrill Park
 Raritan Bay Waterfront Park
 Roosevelt Park
 Spring Lake Park
 Thompson Park
 Warren Park
 Old Bridge Waterfront Walkway
 Alvin P. Williams Memorial Park
 Ambrose & Doty's Brooks Park
 Davidson's Mill Pond Park
 Ireland Brook Park
 Jamesburg Park Conservation Area
 John A. Phillips Open Space Preserve
 John A. Phillips Park
 Catherine Von Ohlen Park

See also

 Little India (Middlesex County, New Jersey)
 National Register of Historic Places listings in Middlesex County, New Jersey

References

External links

 Middlesex County official website Retrieved July 1, 2008.
 
 Middlesex County's municipal borders, and unincorporated communities, localities & place names at https://www.state.nj.us/transportation/refdata/gis/maps/middlesex.pdf

 
1683 establishments in New Jersey
Central Jersey
Counties in the New York metropolitan area
Populated places established in 1683